The Radio Man is a  science fiction novel by American writer Ralph Milne Farley.  It is the first book in Farley's Radio Man series. The novel was originally serialized from the June 28, 1924 issue of Argosy. It was first published in book form in 1948 by Fantasy Publishing Company, Inc. in an edition of 1,000 copies. Modern publishers often release The Radio Man under the title An Earth Man on Venus.

Plot introduction
The novel concerns electrical engineer Myles Cabot, who disappears from his home in Boston while performing an experiment.  He finds himself transported to the planet Venus where he is captured by the Formians, a race of ant-like creatures.  After learning  of the Cupians, a human-like race that is subservient to the Formians, Cabot escapes and falls in love with the Cupian princess Lilla.  He goes on to introduce the Cupians to gunpowder and leads them in a revolt against their Formian masters.

Adaptations 

Wally Wood illustrated a 26-page adaptation of the story in a one-shot comic book entitled An Earth Man on Venus for Avon Periodicals in 1951, with cover by Gene Fawcette. The story was reprinted in Strange Planets #11 from I.W. Enterprises in the early 1960s. with cover by Ross Andru and Mike Esposito.

See also
Planetary romance
Venus in fiction

Sources

External links
 
 
 

1948 American novels
American science fiction novels
Novels first published in serial form
Novels set on Venus
Works originally published in Argosy (magazine)
Fantasy Publishing Company, Inc. books